Ageletha hemiteles (webbing moth) is a moth of the family Oecophoridae. It is found in Australia, more specifically Tasmania, New South Wales and Victoria.

The wingspan is about 25 mm.

The larvae feed on various Eucalyptus species.

References

Oecophorinae
Moths described in 1883